Shamshir Khaneh (also Romanized as Shamshīr Khāneh; also known as Shamshīr Khānī) is a village in Sardabeh Rural District, in the Central District of Ardabil County, Ardabil Province, Iran. At the 2006 census, its population was 37, in 7 families.

References 

Towns and villages in Ardabil County